John McQueen (1804–1867) was an American lawyer and politician.

John McQueen may also refer to:
 John C. McQueen (1899–1985), United States Marine Corps general
 John Henry McQueen (1916–1977), American Negro league outfielder 
 John Paul McQueen, a fictional character from the British soap opera Hollyoaks

See also
 John McQueen Johnston (1901–1987), Scottish physician and pharmacologist